Aldreth is a hamlet in Cambridgeshire with about 260 residents (2001 census). It is located near the larger village of Haddenham (where the population is listed) and falls under the same Parish council. Aldreth is surrounded by fenland on all sides and is close to the River Great Ouse.

History

Toponymy 
The name "Aldreth" occurs as Alreheða in the 1170 Pipe rolls, and means "landing-place by the alders", from a combination of the Old English words for "alder" and "hythe". The name also occurs a number of times in the text of the 12th century Liber Eliensis, as Alreheðe, with one variant as Alhereðe.

Battles 

Aldreth may have been the site of two battles  between Hereward the Wake (Anglo-Saxons) and William the Conqueror (Normans).

Geography

Geology 
The village is on an east–west running boulder clay (middle-Pleistocene till) ridge sitting on a belt of mainly Jurassic Kimmerigian clays running south-west from The Wash.  To the east is a north–south running belt of geologically more recent Upper-Cretaceous Lower Greensand capped by Lower-Cretaceous Gault Clay; the whole area is surrounded by even more recent fen deposits. To the west, again running north-east—south-west, is a scarp belt of middle-Jurassic sedimentary rocks including limestone and sandstone.

Community
Aldreth shares an annual village open day, Blossoms & Bygones, with neighbouring village Haddenham. The event, which includes tractor rides, vintage car and tractor displays, and open gardens, held its 40th Anniversary in 2011 with a VE Day theme, with villagers dressed in 1940s costume.

References

Bibliography 
 
 *

External links

Haddenham & Aldreth Blossoms & Bygones Pictures 2011
 Aldreth in Vision of Britain
 A castle at Alrehede/Aldreth was constructed in 1071
 CHER record for Aldreth causeway (archaeology)
 The search for Hereward the Wake

Hamlets in Cambridgeshire
East Cambridgeshire District